"End Game" is a song by American singer-songwriter Taylor Swift, featuring English singer Ed Sheeran and American rapper Future. The song is taken from Swift's sixth studio album, Reputation (2017). Written by the three artists and producers Max Martin and Shellback, "End Game" is a pop rap and power pop song that hybridizes hip hop and R&B. It features loose cadences, trap beats, and hip hop-influenced drums. The lyrics are about finding true love amidst the tumultuous gossip on ones' perceived reputations.

"End Game" first premiered as a radio single in France on November 14, 2017, and was later released as an international single in early 2018. Contemporary critics received "End Game" with mixed reviews; some praised the hip-hop experimentation and Future's appearance and hailed the production as catchy, but others found the track and Sheeran's appearance uninteresting. The single reached the top 40 on the singles charts and received platinum certifications in Australia, Canada, and the U.S.

A music video for the single, directed by Joseph Kahn, was released on January 12, 2018. The video depicts Swift partying with Future in Miami, with Sheeran in Tokyo, and with other friends in London. Swift performed "End Game" at the 2017 Jingle Ball, and during the shows of her 2018 Reputation Stadium Tour.

Production and composition

"End Game" was produced by Max Martin and Shellback. The two also co-wrote the song with Taylor Swift, Ed Sheeran and Future. Swift is credited as the main singer, while Sheeran and Future are credited as featured artists. It was recorded for Swift's sixth studio album, Reputation (2017). The song is the only song on Reputation that features guest artists. For his songwriting, Sheeran came up with the inspiration while attending a Fourth of July party at Swift's residence in Rhode Island. At that party, Sheeran encountered Cherry Seaborn, a girl who went to the same school with him. They reconnected and ultimately became married. His verse includes a reference to the film Born on the Fourth of July (1989), a symbol of the beginning of his relationship with Seaborn. The song was recorded at three studios: MXM Studios in Los Angeles and Stockholm, Seismic Activities Studios in Portland, Oregon, and Tree Sound Studios in Atlanta. It was mixed by Serban Ghenea at MixStar Studios in Virginia Beach, Virginia; and Mastered by Randy Merrill at Sterling Sound Studios in New York.

Musically, "End Game" is a hybrid of hip hop and R&B. Billboard categorized the song as pop-rap, while Michelle Da Silva from Now called it a power pop song. The song incorporates loose cadences, trap beats, and hip hop-influenced drums, which Pitchfork Meaghan Garvey described as representative of 2017's hip hop/R&B trends. In the lyrics, the three artists talk about their true love amidst the gossip about their perceived reputations. At the song's beginning, Swift asserts that she and her lover both have "bad" and "big reputations". Future then echoes this perspective, saying that he has a "bad boy persona, that's what they like". In his part, Sheeran raps about how his love interest was "born on the Fourth of July". For Swift's part, she channels half-singing, half-rapping delivery found in hip hop, making fun of the media gossip on her image: "I swear I don't love the drama / It loves me." The chorus finds Swift singing "I wanna be your endgame" to her lover.

Release and promotion
On November 7, 2017, Swift announced track listing of Reputation, where "End Game" was unveiled. Three days later, the album was released with "End Game" being its second track. The song was picked as the third single promoting the project. On November 14, Mercury Records issued the song to French radio airplay. On February 22, 2018, the track was made available for mainstream and rhythmic contemporary radio formats in the United States through Republic Records.

Swift and Sheeran performed "End Game" for the first time during the Jingle Ball festival hosted by iHeartRadio on December 2, 2017. A solo version of the song was included in the regular set list for Swift's Reputation Stadium Tour (2018).

Critical reception

The song received mixed reviews from critics. Kitty Empire from The Observer selected "End Game" as an example for Swift's experimentation with R&B on Reputation, noting that it "isn't very good". In a review by Pitchfork, Meaghan Garvey was not impressed by the guest appearances of Future and Sheeran, the former of which was seemingly a means to help Swift stay relevant with contemporary hip hop trends. Garvey also criticized the production as bland, feeling that the song is an "uninspired" attempt at the authentic hip hop sound: "The decisions here feel measured to the point of lifelessness; preoccupied by the end game, risks become liabilities." Brian Josephs from Spin praised Future's verse, feeling that the rapper "fully owned it, making him a bizarrely good fit for a modern day Swift song". Josephs however was disappointed with Sheeran's appearance, and considered the song's overall theme of "attempting to find love in spite of real or perceived enemies" similar to previous "far better" songs by Future.

Writing for PopMatters, Evan Sawdey picked "End Game" as one of Reputation "misguided" songs, alongside "Look What You Made Me Do" and "This Is Why We Can't Have Nice Things". Though complimentary of Future's appearance and Swift's lyrics, Lindsay Lozadz from The Ringer panned Sheeran's verse as "rapping so hard that you can practically smell the sweat he breaks trying to keep up with Future", which blemished the whole song. Michelle Da Silva from Now was critical of Swift's lyrics about drama and vengeance, deeming it inauthentic to her persona.

On a positive side, New York Frank Guan lauded "End Game" as one of the best songs on Reputation, mostly thanks to the verse of Future and Swift's witty lyrics about her perceived image, and said that the song had potentials to be a chart success. Raise Bruner from Time considered the song to be Swift at her peak: "emotionally open, but ready and willing to have some fun with the hype around her own persona". Spencer Kornharber from The Atlantic called the song "maddeningly catchy" and compared its styles to music by Rihanna. Rob Sheffield from Rolling Stone was similarly positive, calling it "deeply weird, wildly funny", praising the chemistry of the three artists and Swift's witty lyrics.

"End Game" was one of the award-winning songs at the 2019 BMI Awards. It also won Pop Award at the 2019 BMI London Awards, in honor of songwriters and producers.

Accolades

Commercial performance

"End Game" was the only non-single song from Reputation to debut on the US Billboard Hot 100 upon the release of the parent album. It debuted on the chart dated December 9, 2017, at number 86, earning Swift her 75th Hot 100 entry. "End Game" debuted at number 32 on the Mainstream Top 40, before rising to number 26 the following week. It debuted at number 38 on the Adult Top 40, eventually peaking at number 13. In its third charting week, "End Game" rose to number 39, giving Swift her 55th Hot 100 top-40 chart entry and becoming Reputation fifth top-40 song, following "Look What You Made Me Do", "...Ready for It?", "Gorgeous", and "Call It What You Want". "End Game" later reached a peak of number 18. The single peaked at number 10 on the Mainstream Top 40, and number 25 on the Rhythmic Songs chart. It was certified platinum by the Recording Industry Association of America (RIAA) for exceeding 1,000,000 units based on sales and streaming in the U.S.

In Canada, "End Game" peaked at number 11 on the Canadian Hot 100 and was certified platinum by Music Canada. The single peaked at number 36 on the Australian ARIA Charts and was certified platinum by the Australian Recording Industry Association (ARIA). It was certified silver by the British Phonographic Industry in the U.K., where it peaked at number 49 on the UK Singles Chart. The song was also certified gold in Brazil and double platinum in Norway.

Music video
On December 2, 2017, Sheeran confirmed at the Jingle Ball festival that a music video for the song would be released. On January 10, 2018, Swift revealed through her social media app "The Swift Life"—an app she created for fans in support of Reputation—that the music video for the song would be released on January 12, and that a snippet of the video would premiere on Good Morning America on January 11. Swift premiered a 20-second snippet on Good Morning America, and posted it on her social media accounts later that day.

On January 12, 2018, Swift uploaded the video onto her Vevo channel. Directed by Joseph Kahn, the video depicts Swift partying at three locations during nighttime: with Future and partygoers on a yacht in Miami, with Sheeran at a nightclub in Tokyo, and with various friends on a double decker bus in London. While singing/rapping with Future, Swift is seen riding shotgun in a Lamborghini Aventador with him. In one of the London scenes, Swift is seen sitting on a bar playing Snake on a handheld game console, a reference to her reputation as a "snake" during promotion of the album. This reference is also noted in one of the Tokyo scenes, in which Swift rides a motorcycle in a snakeskin-patterned bodysuit. The superyacht MIZU was used for the Miami filming.

Frank Guan from New York observed that the video effectively eschewed Swift's previously well-known girl next door image, by "drinking, playing a game on her mobile phone, hamming it up at a karaoke bar, cheerfully failing at Dance Dance Revolution, really getting into Future, having a crowd of friends with only a few white girls and no white guys [apart from Ed Sheeran] in sight". Guan was impressed by the video's nighttime aesthetics featuring darkness against flashing lights and vivid colors, writing that "the end result is as simple as it is appealing". Lyndsey McKenna from NPR Music was less enthusiastic: "It's pretty hard to buy Swift and Sheeran's casual outing in Tokyo or Swift's supposedly uninhibited dance moves."

Credits and personnel
Credits are adapted from the liner notes of Reputation.

 Taylor Swift – vocals, songwriter
 Max Martin – producer, songwriter, keyboards, programming
 Shellback – producer, songwriter, keyboards, programming, drums, bass
 Ed Sheeran – vocals, songwriter
 Future – vocals, songwriter
 Ilya – additional vocal producer
 Sam Holland – engineer
 Michael Ilbert – engineer
 Seth Ferkins – engineer
 Cory Bice – assistant engineer
 Jeremy Lertola – assistant engineer
 Sean Flora – assistant engineer
 Peter Karlsson – assistant engineer
 Mike  – assistant engineer
 Daniel Watson – assistant engineer
 Serban Ghenea – mixing
 John Hanes – mix engineer
 Randy Merrill – mastering

Charts

Weekly charts

Year-end charts

Certifications

Release history

References

External links
 

Taylor Swift songs
Ed Sheeran songs
Future (rapper) songs
2017 singles
2017 songs
Songs written by Taylor Swift
Songs written by Ed Sheeran
Songs written by Future (rapper)
Songs written by Max Martin
Songs written by Shellback (record producer)
Song recordings produced by Max Martin
Song recordings produced by Shellback (record producer)
Big Machine Records singles
Music videos directed by Joseph Kahn
Pop-rap songs
Power pop songs
Contemporary R&B songs